Olena Kalytiak Davis (born September 16, 1963) is a Ukrainian-American poet.

Davis is the author of five poetry collections, her most recent being Late Summer Ode. Her collection The Poem She Didn't Write And Other Poems (2014, Copper Canyon Press) was a 2014 Lannan Literary Selection. Her first book, And Her Soul Out Of Nothing, won the Brittingham Prize (University of Wisconsin Press). Her second book, the cult classic shattered sonnets love cards and other off and back handed importunities (2003, Tin House Books), was republished by Copper Canyon Press in 2014.

Her honors include a 2004 Guggenheim Fellowship in poetry and a 1996 Rona Jaffe Foundation Writers' Award in poetry.

Her poems have been published in literary journals and magazines including AGNI, A Small Number, New England Review, Tin House, Poetry Northwest, Michigan Quarterly Review, Field, Indiana Review, Post Road Magazine and in anthologies including Best American Poetry 1995 and Legitimate Dangers: American Poets of the New Century (Sarabande Books).

Davis is a first-generation Ukrainian-American, and she grew up in Detroit. She was educated at Wayne State University, University of Michigan Law School, and Vermont College of Fine Arts.  She is also a contributing editor at The Alaska Quarterly Review. She has lived in San Francisco, Prague, Lviv, Paris, Chicago, and the Yup'ik community of Bethel, Alaska, and currently lives in Anchorage, Alaska, where she works as a lawyer.

Published works
1997 And Her Soul Out of Nothing (winner of the Brittingham Prize in Poetry, published by the University of Wisconsin Press)
2003 Shattered Sonnets, Love Cards, and Other Off-And-Back Handed Importunities (poetry) Portland, OR:Tin House Books. 
2009  On the Kitchen Table from Which Everything Has Been Hastily Removed. Published by Hollyridge Press. 
2014  The Poem She Didn't Write And Other Poems, Published by Copper Canyon Press. 
2014  shattered sonnets love cards and other back handed importunities, Republished by Copper Canyon Press. 
2022  Late Summer Ode, Published by Copper Canyon Press.

References

External links
 rhubarb is susan > A Review of Davis' work
 Shattered Sonnets, Love Cards, And Other Off-And-Back Handed Importunities at Tin House Books
 American Booksellers Association > Bookselling This Week: Features: Poet Olena Kalytiak Davis Talks About Spring, T.S. Eliot, and Wonderoos

Living people
Wayne State University alumni
University of Michigan Law School alumni
Poets from Michigan
Poets from Alaska
Vermont College of Fine Arts alumni
1963 births
American women poets
Rona Jaffe Foundation Writers' Award winners
21st-century American poets
American people of Ukrainian descent
21st-century American women writers